Hajjat Kadeh (also Romanized as Ḩājjat Kadeh) is a village in Dizaj Rural District, in the Central District of Khoy County, West Azerbaijan Province, Iran. At the 2006 census, its population was 160, in 29 families.

References 

Populated places in Khoy County